Chuckie Dreyfus (born Charles de Joya Dreyfus on August 7, 1974) is a Filipino film actor. He received his first award as Best Child Performer 1984 at the Metro Manila Film Festival, won the FAMAS Award 1985 for Best Child Actor in the film Idol in which he played the sidekick of Philippine action star, Rudy Fernandez and in 1988 won Best Child Performer in Film Academy of the Philippines (FAP) Award for Once Upon a Time.

Career
Dreyfus was 10 years old when he made his film debut in the 1984 film Idol with Rudy Fernandez. He was seen in numerous TV commercials like Colgate, KFC, Pizza Hut and in print ads as well.

Following the film's success, he joined the cast of That's Entertainment, a show geared toward Filipino youth. He was paired with Isabel Granada as a "loveteam" in a number of films.  Two examples are Magic to Love (1989) and Lessons in Love (1990).

Dreyfus was part of GMA-7's Survivor Philippines: Celebrity Doubles Showdown (2011-2012). He was also in the GMA TV series Daldalita (2011-2012), which also starred Jillian Ward, Manilyn Reynes and Ogie Alcasid, Magdalena (TV Series), Mga Basang Sisiw, and more.

Dreyfus' other professional roles include being a songwriter, composer and a musical scorer. He learned midi sequencing and arranging by himself in between film and television projects and he eventually started arranging musical numbers for other artists going on road-shows and concert tours. Apart from this, Dreyfus also started arranging medleys and special song numbers for GMA Supershow and That's Entertainment. This innate musical talent was further honed when he began to concentrate on his own musical compositions which resulted to the songs "The Luv Bug", "Keep On Walking", "Let's Go Retro", "Hiling", and the carrier single "Kahit Na" of the album The Luv Bug which was released by the REtroSPECT band under Alpha Records.

Dreyfus is a member of FILSCAP and a member of the Judging & Screening Committee for the “Awit Awards” for the past 15 years. Dreyfus also composed the song "The Quiz Bee Dream" for the Quiz Bee Foundation. He was the Musical Director of television shows such as SCQ Reload (ABS-CBN), SCQpids (ABS-CBN), Pinoy Big Brother (Primers) (ABS-CBN), Blind Item (ABC-5, "now TV5") and Your Song (ABS-CBN).

He is the musical director of such films as Masikip sa Dibdib (Viva Films), D' Anothers (Star Cinema), Binibining K (Regal Films) and Agent X44 (Star Cinema).

Dreyfus is also the composer of the Rachelle Ann Go song "Bakit" from the album I Care, under Viva Records. "Bakit" also became the theme song of ABS-CBN's evening telenovela, Mirada de Mujer.

He also produced the theme song of the teen show SCQ Reload titled "Kilig Ako".  He composed two songs ("Miss" and "Kahit Na") included on Sarah Geronimo's album Taking Flight under Viva Records, and is also the songwriter of the song "Laging Kay Ganda" from Geronimo's album MyPhone.

Personal life
Charles "Chuckie" Dreyfus is the only child of architect Henry Dreyfus and Cynthia Dreyfus. Dreyfus comes from a line originating from Alsace, France. His family is from the province of Negros Occidental.

Dreyfus is married to Marie Aileen Regina Bayani-Dreyfus. They tied the knot in 2001 at Santuario de San Jose in Greenhills. They have two children, Ralph and Isabella.

Awards and nominations
1988: Nominated Best Child Actor FAMAS Award - Once Upon a Time (1987)
1988: Won Best Child Performer FAP Award - Once Upon a Time (1987)
1985: Won Best Child Actor FAMAS Award - Idol (1984)
1984: Won Best Child Performer Metro Manila Film Festival - Idol (1984)

Filmography

Television

Film

Music

As songwriter
I Care album by Rachelle Ann Go
"Bakit" (2006)
Taking Flight - album by Sarah Geronimo
"Kahit Na" (2007)
"Miss" (2007)

Music scorer
Agent X44 (2007)
Binibining K (2006)
D' Anothers (2005)
Masikip sa Dibdib (2004)

See also
 Migo Adecer

References

External links

1974 births
Living people
GMA Network personalities
That's Entertainment Wednesday Group Members
Participants in Philippine reality television series
Survivor Philippines contestants
Male actors from Manila
People from Negros Occidental